Akers is an unincorporated community in northwestern Shannon County, Missouri, United States. It is located approximately eighteen miles northwest of Eminence in the Ozark National Scenic Riverways. Akers houses a campground and access to the Current River. Since there is no bridge within the community, there is a small ferry that allows vehicles traveling on Highway K to cross the Current River.

History
A post office called Akers was established in 1884, and remained in operation until 1965. John Akers, an early postmaster, gave the community his last name.

In 1925, Akers had 55 inhabitants.

References

 

Unincorporated communities in Shannon County, Missouri
Populated places established in 1886
Unincorporated communities in Missouri